The white currant or whitecurrant is a group of cultivars of the red currant (Ribes rubrum), a species of flowering plant in the family Grossulariaceae, native to Europe.

It is sometimes mislabelled as Ribes glandulosum, which is the 'skunk currant' in the USA.

Description
The white currant differs from the red currant only in the colour and flavour of these fruits, which are a translucent white and sweeter.

Cultivation
Unlike their close relative the blackcurrant, red and white currants are cultivated for their ornamental value as well as their berries.

Currant bushes grow best in partial to full sunlight and can be planted between November and March in well-drained, slightly neutral to acid soil. They are considered cool-climate plants and fruit better in northern areas. They can also be grown in large containers.

The firm and juicy fruit are usually harvested in summer. Whole trusses of fruits should be cut instead of individual fruit, and then either used, or they can be stored in a fridge. They can also be bagged and frozen.

Various forms are known including 'Blanka', 'White Pearl', and 'Versailles Blanche' (syn ‘White Versailles’). 'Versailles Blanche' was first bred in France in 1843.

The cultivar 'White Grape' has gained the Royal Horticultural Society's Award of Garden Merit. There are also cultivars with yellow and pink fruit, called respectively 'yellow currants' and 'pink currants'.

The bushes can suffer from pests such as gooseberry sawfly and birds. The bushes are best grown in fruit cages for protection.

Culinary uses 
White currant berries are slightly smaller and sweeter than red currants. When made into jams and jellies the result is normally pink. The white currant is actually an albino cultivar of the red currant but is marketed as a different fruit.
White currants are rarely specified in savoury cooking recipes compared with their red counterparts. They are often served raw and provide a sweetly tart flavor. White currant preserves, jellies, wines and syrups are also produced. In particular, white currants are the classic ingredient in the highly regarded Bar-le-duc or Lorraine jelly although preparations made of red currants can also be found.

Nutrition
White currant berries are 84% water, 14% carbohydrates, 1% protein, and contain negligible fat (table). In a 100 gram (3.5 oz) reference amount, white currant berries supply 56 calories, and are a rich source (49% of the Daily Value, DV) of vitamin C and a moderate source (10% DV) of vitamin K, with no other micronutrients in appreciable amounts (table).

See also 
 Zante currant
 Gooseberry
 Jostaberry
 Currant

References

External links 
 Currants, California Rare Fruit Growers, 1996

Berries
Ribes